Louise Pauline Marie Héritte-Viardot (14 December 1841 – 17 January 1918) was a French singer, pianist, conductor and composer. She was born in Paris, the eldest child of Pauline Viardot-Garcia and Louis Viardot, niece of Maria Malibran and sister to composer and conductor Paul Viardot.

In 1863 Viardot married Ernest Héritte, Honorary Consul and Chancellor of the Embassy of France in Berne. Her performing career was ended by illness, and with the help of Clara Schumann, she found a teaching position as a singing teacher at the Hoch Conservatory. She died in Heidelberg.

Works
Héritte-Viardot composed mostly chamber music pieces and orchestral works and symphonies, many of which are lost. Selected works include:
Arme kleine Liebe (in Drei Lieder) (Text: Anna Ritter)
Der Schmied, op. 8 no. 5 (Text: Johann Ludwig Uhland)
Erlösung (Text: Anna Ritter)
Saphiren sind die Augen dein (in 6 Lieder) (Text: Heinrich Heine)
Sehnsucht (Text: Anna Ritter)
Sérénade (Text: J. Bertrand)
Tag und Nacht (in Drei Lieder) (Text: Gustav Renner)
Unter'm Machendelbaum (in Drei Lieder) (Text: Ernst von Wildenbruch)
Sonata for cello and piano opus 40, (1909)
Die Bajadere, cantata for chorus and orchestra
Wonne des Himmels, cantata for soloists, chorus and orchestra
Das Bacchusfest, cantata for chorus and orchestra, 1880
Lindoro, comic opera in one act, 1879
Quartet for piano and strings, No. 1 in A Major, Opus 9, Im Sommer, 1883;
Quartet for piano and strings, No. 2 in D major, Op 11, Spanish Quartet, 1883
Quartet for piano and strings, No. 3, 1879

Her works have been recorded and issued on CD, including:
Héritte-Viardot: Piano Quartets Viardot En

Genealogy

References

External links
 
 

1841 births
1919 deaths
Singers from Paris
19th-century classical composers
20th-century classical composers
French classical composers
French women classical composers
19th-century French composers
20th-century French women singers
20th-century French composers
20th-century women composers
19th-century women composers